Powell is a ghost town in Rushville Township, Phillips County, Kansas, United States.

History
Powell was issued a post office in 1882. The post office was discontinued in 1905.

References

Former populated places in Phillips County, Kansas
Former populated places in Kansas